Tyler Daschiel Herron (August 5, 1986 – October 22, 2021) was an American right-handed professional baseball pitcher.

As a senior at Wellington High School in Florida, Herron led the nation with a 0.25 ERA. He was drafted by the St. Louis Cardinals in the First Round of the 2005 Major League Baseball Draft. Herron was ranked the Midwest League # 11 prospect in 2007, and the St. Louis Cardinals # 10 prospect, by Baseball America. He pitched for the Honolulu Sharks in the Rookie 2008 Hawaii Winter Baseball League, and led the league with a 0.69 ERA. Pitching for the Indios de Mayagüez in the winter of 2014, he was a post-season Puerto Rico Liga de Béisbol Profesional Roberto Clemente All Star and a Caribbean World Series All Star. He pitched as high as AAA in 2014 and 2016, for the Washington Nationals and New York Mets farm teams. In 2016, pitching for the Fargo-Moorhead RedHawks, he led the independent American Association with a 0.80 ERA.

Herron pitched for Team Israel at the 2017 World Baseball Classic.

In total, at all levels he pitched 16 seasons, and had a record of 103-95. Herron died on October 22, 2021, aged 35.

Early life
Herron was born and grew up in West Palm Beach, Florida. He later lived in Wellington, Florida. He was of Puerto Rican descent, and one of his grandmothers was Jewish—as a result of which he was eligible to play for Team Israel.

He attended Wellington High School, in Wellington, Florida. Initially, in high school Herron played shortstop and third base. As a senior for the Wellington Wolverines, Herron led the nation with a 0.25 ERA, and struck out 81 batters in 57 innings. He was named to the 2005 ABCA/Rawlings High School All-America Second Team, along with among others future major leaguers Ike Davis and Scott Van Slyke.

Professional career

St. Louis Cardinals
Herron was drafted by the St. Louis Cardinals in the First Round (46th, overall) of the 2005 Major League Baseball Draft. His agent was Jim Munsey, his former T-ball pitcher. He received a $675,000 signing bonus.

He began his professional career in 2005 with the Johnson City Cardinals of the Rookie Appalachian League, going 0–3 in 13 starts with a 5.62 ERA and 49 strikeouts in 49.2 innings as he kept opponents to a .245 batting average. Herron was ranked the Appalachian League # 20 prospect, and the St. Louis Cardinals # 12 prospect, in 2005 by Baseball America.

The following season, pitching for Johnson City, on August 13, 2006, Herron was voted Appalachian League Pitcher of the Week. In 13 starts for Johnson City he was 5–6 with one complete game and a 4.13 ERA, and he lost his one start with the State College Spikes of the Class A-Short New York-Penn League while giving up two runs in six innings.  He was ranked the Appalachian League # 13 prospect, and the St. Louis Cardinals # 18 prospect, in 2006 by Baseball America. Pitching for Johnson City and State College, he averaged 8.88 strikeouts per nine innings pitched, third-best among Cardinals' minor leaguers.

In June 2007, pitching for the Class A Swing of the Quad Cities, he was named Cardinals Minor League Pitcher of the Month. On July 2, 2007, Herron was voted Midwest League Pitcher of the Week.  For the season he was 10–7 with a 3.74 ERA, and in 137.1 innings gave up 26 walks while he had 130 strikeouts (6th in the league) as he kept opponents to a .240 batting average. He averaged 1.69 walks per nine innings as a starter, which was 4th-lowest among Midwest League starters, and his strikeout/walk ratio of 5.00 led the league.  He threw primarily a mid-90s sinking fastball, a solid changeup, and a curveball with a good break. He was ranked the Midwest League # 11 prospect in 2007, and the St. Louis Cardinals # 10 prospect, by Baseball America.

Pitching for the Class A-Advanced Palm Beach Cardinals, on August 4, 2008, Herron was voted Florida State League Pitcher of the Week. For the season for the team, he was 2–2 with a 2.70 ERA in 15 starts, and in 56.2 innings he gave up 11 walks as he kept opponents to a .234 batting average. Pitching for the Springfield Cardinals of the AA Texas League, he was 5–5 with a 5.20 ERA. He was ranked the St. Louis Cardinals # 23 prospect after the 2008 season by Baseball America. He pitched for the Honolulu Sharks in the Rookie 2008 Hawaii Winter Baseball League, and led the league with a 0.69 ERA.

Pitching for the Springfield Cardinals in 2009 he was 2–4 with a 4.34 ERA in 9 starts. Herron was released by the St. Louis Cardinals in June 2009.

Pittsburgh Pirates
Herron was then signed that month by the Pittsburgh Pirates. Pitching the remainder of the season for the Altoona Curve of the AA Eastern League, he was 0–2 with a 4.50 ERA. He was released by the Pirates in October 2009.

Kalamazoo Kings
In 2010, Herron pitched for the Kalamazoo Kings in the independent Frontier League, primarily as a reliever, throwing between 89 and 93 mph with his fastball, and was 1-3 with three saves and a 3.50 ERA. He did not pitch in 2011 due to rehabilitation from surgery for an arm injury.

Fargo-Moorhead RedHawks
In 2012, he pitched for the Fargo-Moorhead Redhawks of the independent American Association, going 12–3 with a 3.29 ERA (6th in the league) in 23 games (17 starts) over 123 innings with 105 strikeouts (6th in the league) and 30 walks. His 12 wins tied for second-best in the league, and his strikeouts/walks ratio of 3.50 was 7th-best in the league.

Washington Nationals
In December 2012 the Washington Nationals signed Herron as a free agent to a minor league contract.  In 2013, he pitched for the Potomac Nationals of the Class A-Advanced Carolina League, for whom he was 1–1 with one save and a 1.70 ERA as he struck out 32 batters in 20.1 innings as he kept opponents to a .222 batting average, and the Harrisburg Senators of the AA Eastern League for whom he was 6–2 with five saves and a 3.11 ERA as he struck out 58 batters in 46.1 innings and kept opponents to a .247 batting average.

Pitching for the Indios de Mayagüez in the winter of 2013, in the Puerto Rico Liga de Béisbol Profesional Roberto Clemente, in 19 games (third in the league) in relief Herron was 1–0 with 12 saves and a 0.84 ERA (leading the league, for all pitchers with 20 or more innings pitched).

In 2014, Herron pitched for the Harrisburg Senators for whom he was 3–2 with six saves and a 2.73 ERA in 48 relief appearances (tied for 6th in the league), and for the Syracuse Chiefs of the AAA International League for whom he pitched 1.2 innings.

Pitching for the Indios de Mayagüez in the winter of 2014, he was a post-season Puerto Rico Liga de Béisbol Profesional Roberto Clemente All Star.  Pitching for Puerto Rico in 2014, Herron was a Caribbean World Series All Star.

Fargo-Moorhead RedHawks (second stint)
In 2015, Herron pitched for the Fargo-Moorhead RedHawks of the American Association, and was 6–7 with a 4.47 ERA in 20 starts, tied for second in the league with four complete games and two shutouts, and was third in the American Association with 119 strikeouts in 131 innings. Pitching for the Indios de Mayagüez in the Puerto Rico Liga de Béisbol Profesional Roberto Clemente in the winter of 2015, he was 5–2 with a 1.96 ERA in 18 relief appearances.

In 2016, pitching for the Fargo-Moorhead RedHawks, he led the American Association with a 0.80 ERA in 56 innings in which he walked 12 batters, had a 5–1 record with two shutouts, and held opponents to a .161 batting average, at the time he was signed by the Mets.

New York Mets
In June 2016 the New York Mets signed Herron as a free agent to a minor league contract. In 2016, he pitched for the Binghamton Mets of the AA Eastern League for whom he was 2–6 with a 6.32 ERA in 11 starts, and the Las Vegas 51s of the AAA Pacific Coast League for whom he was 1–0 with a 2.70 ERA. In November 2016 he elected to become a free agent.

Tigres de Quintana Roo
On March 28, 2017, Herron signed with the Tigres de Quintana Roo of the Mexican Baseball League. He made 12 starts, finishing with a record of 3–5 and a 5.52 ERA before he was released on June 11, 2017.

Fargo-Moorhead RedHawks (third stint)
He re-signed with the Fargo-Moorhead RedHawks of the American Association on June 20, 2017, for whom he was 9-3 with three complete games and an ERA of 2.92.

Lincoln Saltdogs
On January 30, 2018, Herron was traded to the Lincoln Saltdogs of the American Association. Pitching for them in the first half of 2018 he was 4-5 with a 7.33 ERA.

Winnipeg Goldeyes
On July 12, 2018, Herron was claimed off waivers by the Winnipeg Goldeyes of the American Association. Pitching for them in 2018 he was 2-4 with two complete games, one shutout, and a 3.19 ERA in 36.2 innings. He was released following the conclusion of the 2018 season.

High Point Rockers
On May 1, 2019, Herron signed with the High Point Rockers of the Atlantic League of Professional Baseball. Pitching 17 starts for the team in 2019, he was 2-7 with a 6.05 ERA in 93.2 innings.

Sioux Falls Canaries
On July 31, 2019, he was traded to the Sioux Falls Canaries of the American Association. Pitching seven starts for the team in 2019, he was 1-3 with once complete game and a 3.78 ERA in 50.0 innings. Herron was released by the Canaries on February 4, 2020. However, he later re-signed with the Canaries on May 21, 2020. In 2020 for the Canaries he was 7-1 with one complete game and a 4.60 ERA in 76.1 innings, while also serving as the team’s bench coach.

On May 4, 2021, Herron was released by the Canaries.

Fargo-Moorhead RedHawks (fourth stint)
On June 15, 2021, Herron signed with the Fargo-Moorhead RedHawks of the American Association of Professional Baseball. Herron struggled to a 15.26 ERA in 3 appearances in which he pitched 7.2 innings with Fargo before he was released on June 30.

Herron's career eight-season minor league record was 38–41, with a 4.12 ERA, and 588 strikeouts in 667 innings. His career foreign league record over nine seasons was 16–13 with a 3.77 ERA, and 192 strikeouts in 234 innings. And his career independent league record over 10 seasons was 49–41, with a 4.03 ERA, with 640 strikeouts over 800.2 innings. In total, at all levels he pitched 16 seasons facing 7,323 batters, had a record of 103-95 with 38 saves and a 4.10 ERA, and 1,420 strikeouts in 1701.2 innings.

Death
Herron died at his apartment in the United States on October 22, 2021, aged 35.

World Baseball Classic; Team Israel
Herron was on the roster for Israel at the 2017 World Baseball Classic qualifier, but did not pitch.

Herron pitched for Team Israel at the 2017 World Baseball Classic in March 2017. He said it was: "The best experience I've ever had in baseball for sure... It was the coolest experience I've ever had."

References

External links

1986 births
2021 deaths
2017 World Baseball Classic players
Altoona Curve players
American expatriate baseball players in Mexico
Atenienses de Manatí (baseball) players
Baseball coaches
Baseball players from Florida
Binghamton Mets players
Fargo-Moorhead RedHawks players
Harrisburg Senators players
High Point Rockers players
Honolulu Sharks players
Indios de Mayagüez players
Jewish American baseball players
Johnson City Cardinals players
Kalamazoo Kings players
Las Vegas 51s players
Liga de Béisbol Profesional Roberto Clemente pitchers
Lincoln Saltdogs players
Mexican League baseball pitchers
Palm Beach Cardinals players
People from Wellington, Florida
Potomac Nationals players
Sioux Falls Canaries players
Somerset Patriots players
Sportspeople from West Palm Beach, Florida
Springfield Cardinals players
State College Spikes players
Swing of the Quad Cities players
Syracuse Chiefs players
Tigres de Quintana Roo players
21st-century American Jews